Road signs in Portugal are governed by the "Regulamento de Sinalização do Trânsito" (Road Signage Regulation) of the Republic of Portugal.

They are installed along the road on the right side of the road and are subdivided into warning signs (group A), regulatory signs (groups B-D), subdivided into priority, prohibition, obligation and specific prescription signs, indication signs (groups H-T), subdivided into information signs, pre-signalling, direction, confirmation, location identification, supplementary signs, additional signs and temporary signs (groups AT and TC).

The typeface used on road signs is Transport Heavy (the same as used in Italy). Portugal is an original signatory to the Vienna Convention on Road Signs and Signals.

Warning signs

Priority signs

Prohibition signs

Mandatory signs

Information signs

Additional signs

References

Portugal